Pleasant Valley Colony may refer to:

 Pleasant Valley Colony, Montana
 Pleasant Valley Colony, South Dakota